Pedro Ponce de León (1510–1573) was a Spanish bishop who served as Bishop of Plasencia (1560–1573) and Bishop of Ciudad Rodrigo (1550–1560).

Biography
Pedro Ponce de León was born in Córdoba, Andalusia in 1510. He was educated at the University of Salamanca and then ordained as a priest. In 1546, Charles I of Spain appointed Ponce de León to the Supreme Council of the Spanish Inquisition. On 27 June 1550, he was appointed during the papacy of Pope Julius III as Bishop of Ciudad Rodrigo. 26 January 1560, he was translated during the papacy of Pope Pius IV to the See of Plasencia. He attended the Council of Trent.  He was appointed Grand Inquisitor of Spain in December 1572, but died before assuming office.

Ponce de León gained a reputation as a patron of ecclesiastical construction and of scholarship.  He assembled a large library that came to the attention of Philip II of Spain.  Many of these volumes would form the basis of the Biblioteca Laurentina in El Escorial.

Ponce de León died in Jaraicejo in 1573.

References

External links and additional sources
 (for Chronology of Bishops) 
 (for Chronology of Bishops) 
 (for Chronology of Bishops)  
 (for Chronology of Bishops) 
This page is based on this page on Spanish Wikipedia.

1510 births
1573 deaths
Grand Inquisitors of Spain
University of Salamanca alumni
Bishops of Ciudad Rodrigo
16th-century Roman Catholic bishops in Spain